The 1944 Oklahoma Sooners football team represented the University of Oklahoma in the 1944 college football season. In their fourth year under head coach Dewey Luster, the Sooners compiled a 6–3–1 record (4–0–1 against conference opponents), won the Big Six Conference championship, and outscored their opponents by a combined total of 227 to 149.

No Sooners received All-America honors in 1944, but four Sooners received all-conference honors: Merle Dinkins (end), John Harley (tackle), Bob Mayfield (center), and W.G. Wooten (end).

Schedule

Postseason

NFL Draft
The following players were drafted into the National Football League following the season.

References

Oklahoma
Oklahoma Sooners football seasons
Big Eight Conference football champion seasons
Oklahoma Sooners football